The Kodak Professional DCS Pro SLR/c is a 13.5 megapixel digital SLR camera produced by Eastman Kodak.  It is full frame—it uses an image sensor that is the full size of a 35 mm (36x24 mm) frame.  It is compatible with Canon EOS (EF mount) lenses.  The camera was launched on March 18, 2004, and incorporates the internal systems of the previous Nikon-compatible SLR/n in a Sigma SA9 SLR body.

Both the SLR/c and the SLR/n were officially discontinued by Kodak on May 31, 2005, although remaining stock would be sold and the cameras would be fully supported through 2008.  Kodak cited poor profitability of the sector in its announcement.

See also 
Kodak DCS Pro SLR/n
Kodak DCS

References 
 Kodak page on the DCS Pro SLR/c.
 Press release archived at dpreview.com.

Kodak EF-mount cameras
Full-frame DSLR cameras